Orca is the name of two fictional anti-hero characters who appear in American comic books published by DC Comics, commonly known as one of the adversaries to the superhero Batman.

Publication history
The Grace Balin version of Orca first appeared in Batman #579 (July 2000) and was created by Larry Hama and Scott McDaniel.

The Dean Toye version of Orca first appeared in Aquaman (vol. 8) #12.

Fictional character biography

Grace Balin
Grace Balin attends Gotham Gate College and quickly becomes fascinated with the ocean. She receives a Ph.D. in marine biology and bio-medicine and takes a job at the Gotham Aquarium. She is a very charitable person who funds an after-school program involving the ocean for underprivileged youths. She also volunteers at a soup shelter and takes care of many homeless people. Dr. Balin is later involved in an accident that leaves her paralyzed, dependent on a wheelchair for mobility. She continues to work at the Gotham Aquarium until it is supposed to be closed for lack of funding. Grace experiments with spinal cord tissue regeneration using orca spinal cord tissue. The gene therapy studies and human experimentation that she was conducting are deemed controversial, resulting in her loss of funding. It is implied that Grace used a chemical formula that she derived from an orca in the aquarium on herself and that this is what caused her to transform into Orca. She can easily switch between being Orca and her regular appearance as Dr. Balin, although she is still paralyzed as Balin even if Orca is fully mobile. Orca begins a crime spree in Gotham City by stealing a valuable diamond called the Flame of Persia from rogue millionaire Camille Baden-Smythe. After the theft, Batman becomes involved. Orca's dedication to what she perceives as justice conflicts with Batman's attempts to see that everyone is entitled to legal protection even if he dislikes them personally. Orca aims to sell the diamond and use the proceeds to help fund several projects for underprivileged people. After her attempt to sell the diamond back to Camille Baden-Smythe fails with the discovery that she had stolen the diamond originally, Orca attempts to kill her. Camille's security force shoots Orca several times, mortally wounding her. After an extensive underwater chase — Batman using an aquatic-equipped suit — she begins changing back into Dr. Balin in an underwater cavern, telling Batman that the only way that she can survive is if he gives her the rest of the chemical formula that turned her into Orca and that this would permanently transform her into Orca. Although Camille tried to forbid Batman from giving her the formula, arguing that such an action would make Batman responsible for everyone she would subsequently kill, Batman, states that they are all responsible for their actions, as well as that he refuses to allow anyone to die. Having ingested the formula, Orca swims away and resolved to continue her current career. It is revealed that the jewel was then sold to its original owner and that the money was used to build a new recreation center near the aquarium as well as to "...gentrify a derelict waterfront tenement".

Orca is not seen again until she appears as a prisoner in the Slab during the Joker's "Last Laugh" riots. She can escape during the riots with King Shark.

One Year Later, Orca is found dead in the sewers under Gotham City. She appears to have been shot in the head by Harvey Dent's gun, although Batman is convinced Dent is not the true killer. He finds that her body has been partially eaten by Killer Croc. Orca's husband Terry was murdered by the Tally Man while he was being questioned about the disappearance of his wife by a private investigator Jason Bard. During the investigation it is revealed that Orca was working for the Penguin along with now deceased supervillains the KGBeast, the Magpie, and the Ventriloquist. Someone had contracted Orca and other supervillains to turn on the Penguin and rob one of his storage facilities. Harvey Dent catches them and instructs them to stay loyal to Penguin and to get any information they could about him. Dent is the prime suspect in their murders, but it turns out that they were orchestrated by the Great White Shark, who plans on becoming the top crime boss in Gotham. He manages to accomplish two tasks at once, weakening the Penguin's forces and transforming Harvey Dent back into Two-Face.

In the "DC Rebirth" relaunch, Orca and her Death Cycle are mentioned by Cheshire and Copperhead as some of the many villains who have attempted to kill Batman for Two-Face. Her first appearance is in Nightwing (vol. 4) #11, where she is a part of a criminal group in Bludhaven called the Whale's Enders and is ordered to kill Nightwing. Grace was formerly a member of the Run-Offs, a rehab group for former Gotham supervillains, but left because she considered herself too much of a monster to relate to them (implying that her transformation is permanent). After Nightwing and the Run-Offs defeat her, she reveals that they were just a distraction for Carter Forsyth to be killed by the False Face Society.

During Raptor's invasion of Bludhaven, Roland Desmond demonstrates his power to the Whale's Enders by easily taking down Orca with his bare hands. The Whale's Enders try to replicate Grace's formula to transform themselves into whale hybrids to level the playing field, but fail miserably and dissolve after they are defeated by Nightwing. When Raptor starts wreaking havoc in the city by using Roland's Blockbuster formula on the citizens, the Run-Offs seek Grace's knowledge in developing an antidote to cure the affected people. Orca's biochemistry knowledge helps save the city and she rejoins the Run-Offs at the end of the story arc.

During the Gotham City Monsters story Orca is shown to be a semi-vigilante by protecting Gotham Harbors from crime as she considered it her home and joins Andrew Bennet, Frankenstien, Killer Croc, Lady Clay, and later Batwoman to hunt down King Melmoth after her nephew is killed by him.

Orca then reappears in Suicide Squad: King Shark when she attacks King Shark while one of Orca's old rehab friends now Suicide Squad member Defacer attempts to stop the fighting but Orca is then attacked by sharks and supposedly dies. She is shown to be alive and later helps the two fight the Squad's magic division as well as fighting the island's inhabitants when they are possessed and returning to Bludhaven with Defacer after.

She makes an appearance in The Joker vol. 2 in a short story showing that she is now incarcerated in the women's section of Blackgate penitentiary following a parole violation set up by the Queen of Hearts a member of the Royal Flush Gang at Blackgate who hires Orca to takeout the Joker's lackey Punchline  which she does, confronting her in the showers before fighting and eventually beating her to a pulp. She then joins the Queen and her gang in the prison infirmary as she attempts to kill Punchline only for Orca to turn on her having made a deal with Punchline during their scuffle and as for revenge for landing her in prison as she was about to go straight. Punchline declares herself the new queen of the prison and makes Orca her enforcer as the two then leave the Queen at the hands of her former gang. Later when Punchline orders her prison followers to find a specific inmate Orca finds them but the inmate reveals themselves as an undercover reporter trying to expose Punchline for her involvement during the Joker's takeover of Gotham and claims that she has a "Source" that can help Orca expunge her criminal record. She agrees but Punchline later learns about their plans and sends her followers after them. Orca manages to help the reporter escape but is soon overwhelmed and later drugged by Punchline for her betrayal.

Dean Toye
In the "DC Rebirth" relaunch, there is also another human/killer whale hybrid also called Orca. Sergeant Dean Toye is a member of the Aquamarines, task-forced military operations trained and transformed to combat Atlantis in case of a crisis. As the second-in-command to Major Rhonda Ricoh who has the codename of "Great White", Orca and the Aquamarines are dispatched by the government to kill Aquaman at the time when he was framed by the organization N.E.M.O. Orca and the Aquamarines are defeated by Aquaman and are detained by the Atlanteans as prisoners of war.

Powers and abilities
The Grace Balin version of Orca has immense physical attributes and the ability to operate underwater. Orca's sense of smell is so acute that she can easily find her quarry, even if its visibility was low. She must submerge herself in water before dehydration or after long periods on land. In both forms, Orca possesses a brilliant scientific mind.

The Dean Toye version of Orca also has similar powers, as well as expertise in firearms.

In other media
 The Grace Balin incarnation of Orca appears in The Lego Batman Movie, voiced by Laura Kightlinger.
 The Grace Balin incarnation of Orca appears in Lego Dimensions via The Lego Batman Movie DLC pack.
 The Grace Balin incarnation of Orca appears in the Injustice 2 prequel comic as a member of Ra's al Ghul's Suicide Squad and lover of squad-mate Killer Croc. After getting married and becoming pregnant with Croc's child, Ra's deactivates her and Killer Croc's bombs so they can live a happy life together. However, the pair kill Ra's and allow Gorilla Grodd to take over command of the squad to ensure their teammates' safety.

References

Animal supervillains
Characters created by Larry Hama
Comics characters introduced in 2000
DC Comics animals
DC Comics characters who are shapeshifters
DC Comics characters with superhuman senses
DC Comics characters with superhuman strength
DC Comics female supervillains
DC Comics hybrids
DC Comics scientists
DC Comics metahumans
Fictional characters with superhuman durability or invulnerability
Fictional female scientists
Fictional human–animal hybrids
Fictional orcas
Fictional therianthropes